Scrivener Dam is a concrete gravity dam that impounds the Molonglo River in Canberra, Australian Capital Territory. The dam creates Lake Burley Griffin, which was established for recreational and ornamental purposes.

The dam wall is located on Lady Denman Drive and is adjacent to the National Zoo & Aquarium and a viewing area for the official residence of the Governor-General of Australia.

Technical details

Scrivener Dam, designed in Germany, holds back the waters of the Molonglo River within Lake Burley Griffin. About  of concrete was used in the construction of the dam wall. The dam is designed to handle a once in 5,000 year flood event.

It utilised state-of-the-art post-tensioning techniques to cope with any problems or movements in the riverbed.

Hinge anchors support the flap gates; with six hinges per gate, and four anchors per hinge. The fish-belly gates allow for a precise control of water level, reducing the dead area on the banks between high and low water levels. As at November 2010, the five gates have only been opened simultaneously once in the dam's history, during heavy flooding in 1976.

The dam wall provides a crossing for the lake and consists of a roadway, called Lady Denman Drive, and a bicycle path. The roadway was possible because the dam gates are closed by pushing up from below, unlike most previous designs that wherein the gates were lifted from above.

Dam maintenance

The Authority manages external contractors to deliver services that are competitively tendered.

A routine annual audit of the dam wall undertaken during 2011 revealed that the anchor bolts, which are part of the flap gate hinge mechanism, showed signs of corrosion. It was anticipated that work would be completed by the end of 2013, and cost A$20m.

Flood mitigation
Scrivener Dam is operated in an environment that minimises flooding of the environs of Lake Burley Griffin. With three sluice valves open, outflows of  can be achieved through either automatic or manual operation of the dam.

History

Lake filling
A prolonged drought coincided with and eased work on the lake's construction. The valves on the Scrivener Dam were closed on 20 September 1963 by Interior Minister Gordon Freeth; Prime Minister Menzies was absent due to ill health. Several months on, with no rain in sight, mosquito-infested pools of water were the only visible sign of the lake filling. With the eventual breaking of the drought and several days of heavy rain, the lake filled, and reached the planned level on 29 April 1964.

On 17 October 1964, Menzies commemorated the filling of the lake and the completion of stage one with an opening ceremony amid the backdrop of sailing craft. This was accompanied by fireworks display, and Griffin's lake had finally come to fruition after five decades, at the cost of A$5,039,050.

The dam, together with Lake Burley Griffin and adjacent lands, is listed on the Register of the National Estate, a listing of places of significant natural and cultural heritage. Since 2012, the register has frozen.

See also

 History of Canberra
 History of Lake Burley Griffin

References

External links

 Lake Water Quality Updates includes current water level

Buildings and structures in Canberra
Dams completed in 1963
Gravity dams
Murray-Darling basin
Dams in the Australian Capital Territory